Robert Beglarian is an Iranian MP of Armenian descent, and the current representative of the Armenian community of southern Iran in the parliament.

Biography
He was born in 1961 in Tehran. In March 2015, along with fellow Armenian MP Karen Khanlaryan, Beglaryan was invited to present before the entire Assembly a motion condemning the Armenian genocide.

As of 2015, he is one of the two Armenian representatives in the Iranian parliament.

Electoral history

2004 parliament election
In 2004, Beglarian was elected for the first time and became an MP. His colleague Gevorg Vartan was elected as the representative and MP for the Armenian community of Northern Iran.

2008 parliament election
Beglarian was elected in March 2008 as the representative of Iran's Christian Armenian minority for southern Iran. Beglarian won the majority of the received votes in the parliamentary election held nationwide on March 14, the headquarters said in a statement.

As Iran's Christian Armenian minority consists of two groups including Armenians of Tehran and northern parts of Iran as well as those of the southern parts of the country, two elections take place for both regions, as well as due to the fact that Christian Armenians have two seats at Iran's 290-seat parliament while other religious minorities (Zoroastrians, Jews and Assyrians) have one representative at the county's legislative body.

2012
In 2012, Beglarian was re-elected for a third term, which he is still currently serving.

References

Ethnic Armenian politicians
Iranian people of Armenian descent
Iranian Christians
Isfahan Armenians and South of Iran Representatives in Islamic Consultative Assembly
Living people
Members of the 9th Islamic Consultative Assembly
Members of the 8th Islamic Consultative Assembly
Members of the 7th Islamic Consultative Assembly
Politicians from Tehran
Year of birth missing (living people)